Pseudotropheus elegans is a species of cichlid endemic to Lake Malawi. This species can reach a length of  SL. It can also be found in the aquarium trade.

References

elegans
Fish described in 1935
Taxonomy articles created by Polbot